Richard Whatmore (born February 19, 1968) is a Professor of Modern History at the University of St Andrews. His research topics includes intellectual history.

He is the editor-in-chief of History of European Ideas.

His books include:
 Terrorists, Anarchists, And Republicans: The Genevans And The Irish In Time Of Revolution (Princeton University Press, 2019)
 What is Intellectual History? (Polity, 2015)
 Against War and Empire (Yale University Press, 2012)
 Republicanism and the French Revolution (Oxford University Press, 2000)

Notes 

1968 births
Living people
21st-century American historians
21st-century American male writers
American male non-fiction writers